Take Cover may refer to:

Take Cover (album), a 2007 full-length album by Queensrÿche
Take Cover (Mr. Big EP), a 1996 extended play by Mr. Big, or the title song
Take Cover (Transplants EP), a 2017 extended play by the Transplants
Take Cover, the 2006 debut EP by Philmont
"Take Cover", a song by Evanescence from their 2021 album The Bitter Truth

See also
, anything that can provide physical protection from enemy fire